Seč may refer to places in central Europe:

Seč (Chrudim District), a town in the Czech Republic
Seč Dam next to the town
Seč, Kočevje, an abandoned settlement in the Municipality of Kočevje, Slovenia
Seč, Novo Mesto, an abandoned settlement in the Municipality of Novo Mesto, Slovenia
Seč, Prievidza District, a village in Slovakia

See also
Sec (disambiguation)